The 9th Arabian Gulf Cup was the 9th edition of this tournament. It was held between March 2 and March 18, 1988, in Saudi Arabia. It was the second time after 1972, that Saudi Arabia hosted this regional football tournament. The tournament was won by Iraq. It was the third title for Iraq after having won the tournament 1979 in Baghdad and 1984 in Muscat.

All games were played at the newly built King Fahd International Stadium in Riyadh. The stadium was built to host the 1988 Gulf Cup and the FIFA World Youth Championship one year later.

Having scored four goals each, Ahmed Radhi from Iraq and Zuhair Bakhit from the UAE shared the top-scorer award. Habib Jaafar (Iraq) was voted as best player, Oman's goalkeeper Yousif Obaid won the best-goalkeeper-award.

Oman achieved their first victory in the Gulf Cup tournament after beating Qatar 2–1. Before so, the Oman had failed to win a single match in the 14 years prior.

Matches

Result

References

External links 
 Official Site (Arabic)

1986
1988
1988 in Asian football
1987–88 in Iraqi football
1987–88 in Saudi Arabian football
1987–88 in Emirati football
1987–88 in Kuwaiti football
1987–88 in Qatari football
1987–88 in Bahraini football
1987–88 in Omani football